Yokohl Valley is an unincorporated community in Tulare County, California. It lies at an elevation of 463 feet (141 m).  Currently, the Yokohl Valley area constitutes the most eastern part of Exeter, CA along the foothills.  Yokohl Valley may be reached through Rocky Hill Rd from the west, Myer Dr from the south and Yokohl Dr from the north off CA Hwy 198.

References

Geography of Visalia, California
Unincorporated communities in Tulare County, California
Unincorporated communities in California